Cameron Richardson (born 2 December 1987) is a former Australian rules footballer who played for the North Melbourne Football Club in the Australian Football League (AFL).

He was pre-selected by the new  side and on-traded to North Melbourne in return for the 35th selection in the 2010 AFL Draft from the North Ballarat Football Club in the Victorian Football League.  He made his AFL debut in Round 1 of the 2011 AFL season and played four consecutive games with the club before being dropped to the VFL.

He attended school at Damascus College Ballarat.

References

External links

Living people
1987 births
North Ballarat Football Club players
North Melbourne Football Club players
Australian rules footballers from Victoria (Australia)